Abu Marwan Abd al-Malik II ibn Zidan, also known as Abd el-Malik II (? – 10 March 1631) was the Sultan of Morocco from 1627 to 1631.

Life 
After the expeditions of Isaac de Razilly to Morocco, he signed a Franco-Moroccan treaty with France in 1631, giving France preferential treatment, known as Capitulations: preferential tariffs, the establishment of a Consulate and freedom of religion for French subjects.

The story of his life was published by the English diplomat John Harrison in 1633. He was succeeded by his brother Al Walid ben Zidan.

Notes

1631 deaths
Sultans of Morocco
Saadi dynasty
People from Marrakesh
17th-century Moroccan people
17th-century monarchs in Africa
Year of birth unknown
17th-century Arabs